Jades (also Romanized as Jaddes; also known as Ḩadas and Jadīs) is a village in Deris Rural District, in the Central District of Kazerun County, Fars Province, Iran. At the 2006 census, its population was 367, in 80 families.

References 

Populated places in Kazerun County